, known professionally as  is a former Japanese actor, best known for his role as Ryou Asihara/Kamen Rider Gills in Kamen Rider Agito.

On June 6, 2006, he married Mika Katsumura. In August that same year, Katsumura gave birth to a girl. The couple separated in June 2008 and announced their divorce in August 2008. Katsumura gained custody of their daughter. Yusuke retired from acting on January 11, 2019 after admitting to allegations of domestic violence, adultery and theft. He now works as a grilled meat chef.

Filmography

Film
Kamen Rider Agito: A New Transformation (2001) as Ryou Asihara / Kamen Rider Gills
Kamen Rider Agito: Project G4 (2001) as Ryou Asihara / Kamen Rider Gills
Kamen Rider Ryuki: Episode Final (2002) as Asakura's Victim
Godzilla Against Mechagodzilla (2002) as Lieutenant Susumu Hayama
Godzilla: Tokyo S.O.S. (2003) as Lieutenant Susumu Hayama
Getsuyou Drama series (2003)
Ai no gekijou (2004)
Kiken na kankei (2005)

Television
Kamen Rider Agito (2001-2002) as Ryou Asihara / Kamen Rider Gills
Chiritotechin (2007-2008) as Tomoharu Wada (Kiyomi-A's brother)

Video Games
Kamen Rider Agito (2001) as Kamen Rider Gills
Kamen Rider: Seigi no Keifu (2003) as Kamen Rider Gills
Godzilla vs Mecha Godzilla (2003) as Lieutenant Susumu Hayama

References

External links
 
 

1980 births
Japanese male actors
Living people